Bicton is a hamlet in the Croft and Yarpole parish in Herefordshire, England. It is on a crossroads south of Yarpole and north-east of Kingsland.

Hamlets in Herefordshire